The Return of Martin Fierro is a 1974 Argentine film directed by Enrique Dawi and based on the second part of the poem Martín Fierro by José Hernández.

Cast

External links
 

1974 films
Argentine adventure drama films
1970s Spanish-language films
Films directed by Enrique Dawi
1970s Argentine films